Commando raids were made by the Western Allies during much of the Second World War against the Atlantic Wall. The raids were conducted by the armed forces of Britain, the Commonwealth and a small number of men from the occupied territories serving with No. 10 (Inter-Allied) Commando during the Second World War. All the operations took place between the Arctic Circle in Norway and the France–Spain border, along what was known as the Atlantic Wall.

The raiding forces were mostly provided by the British Commandos, but the two largest raids, Operation Gauntlet and Operation Jubilee, drew heavily on Canadian troops. The size of the raiding force depended on the objective. The smallest raid was two men from No. 6 Commando in Operation J V. The largest raid involved over 10,500 men in Operation Jubilee. Most of the raids were scheduled to only last overnight, but some, like Operation Gauntlet, were conducted over a number of days.

Commando raids during the Second World War became so effective that by October 1942 Adolf Hitler issued the Commando Order, which required the execution of all commandos captured.

The 57 raids were all between 1940 and 1944 and were mostly against targets in France, which saw 36 raids. There were 12 raids in Norway, seven in the Channel Islands and one each in Belgium and the Netherlands. The raids met with a mixture of fortunes. Operation Chariot—the raid against dock installations at Saint-Nazaire—has since been called the greatest raid of all. Others, like Operation Aquatint and Operation Musketoon, resulted in the capture or death of all the commandos involved.

The raids ended in mid-1944 on the orders of Major-General Robert Laycock, the chief of Combined Operations Headquarters. He suggested that they were no longer as effective and only resulted in the Germans strengthening their beach defences, which could be detrimental to Allied plans.

Commandos formation

The Commandos were formed after the British Expeditionary Force was evacuated from Dunkirk in 1940. Prime Minister Winston Churchill called for a force to be assembled and equipped to inflict casualties on the Germans and bolster British morale. Churchill told the joint Chiefs of Staff to propose measures for an offensive against German-occupied Europe, and stated, "they must be prepared with specially trained troops of the hunter class who can develop a reign of terror down the enemy coast."

One staff officer, Lieutenant Colonel Dudley Clarke, had already submitted such a proposal to General Sir John Dill, the Chief of the Imperial General Staff. Dill, aware of Churchill's intentions, approved Clarke's proposal. Three weeks later the first commando raid took place. The raiders failed to gather any intelligence or damage any German equipment; their only success was in killing two German sentries.

In 1940 the call went out for volunteers from among the serving Army soldiers within certain formations still in Britain, and men of the disbanding Divisional Independent Companies originally raised from Territorial Army Divisions who had seen service in Norway. In November 1940 the new army units were organised into a Special Service Brigade under Brigadier J. C. Haydon, with four Special Service Battalions. By the autumn of 1940 more than 2,000 men had volunteered for commando training.

There were 19 British Army Commandos formed in the United Kingdom and the Middle East. The No. 10 (Inter-Allied) Commando was formed from volunteers from the occupied territories and enemy aliens. In February 1942 the Royal Marines were asked to organise commando units of their own; 6,000 men volunteered, forming nine commandos. In 1943 the Royal Naval Commandos and the Royal Air Force Commandos were formed from volunteers from the Royal Navy and the Royal Air Force.

Also in 1943, the commandos started to move away from smaller raiding operations. They were being formed into brigades of assault infantry to spearhead the future Allied landing operations. Of the remaining 20 Commandos, 17 were used in the formation of the four Special Service brigades. The three remaining units, No. 12, No. 14 and No. 62 Commandos, were left to carry out smaller-scale raids. A shortage of volunteers and the need to provide replacements for casualties forced the disbandment of these three commando units by the end of 1943. No. 10 (Inter-Allied) Commando was left for the task of small scale raiding.  No. 10 was the largest commando and was formed from volunteers belonging to the occupied territories. It could now provide both parachute and canoe trained sub units.

The Commandos came under the operational control of the Combined Operations Headquarters. The man initially selected as the commander was Admiral of the Fleet Sir Roger Keyes, a veteran of the Gallipoli Campaign and the Zeebrugge Raid in World War I. Keyes resigned in October 1941 and was replaced by Admiral Louis Mountbatten. The final Commander of Combined Operations was Major General Robert Laycock, who took over from Mountbatten in October 1943.

List

Gallery

Notes
Footnotes

Citations

References

 
 
 
 
 
 
 
 
 
 
 
 
 
 
 
 
 
 
 
 
 
 
 
 
 
 
 
 
 
 

Atlantic Wall, Commando Raids
Atlantic Wall
Atlantic Wall, Commando Raids
Atlantic Wall, Commando Raids
Atlantic Wall, Commando Raids
Atlantic Wall, Commando Raids
Atlantic Wall, Commando Raids
Atlantic Wall, Commando Raids